USS PCE-830 was a U.S.-built Patrol Craft Escort (PCE) vessel launched on 13 June 1943 by the Pullman-Standard Car Company of Chicago, Illinois. She was transferred to the Royal Navy and given the name HMS Kilchrenan in August 1943. As of 2020 she operates as the cruise ship M/S Sunnhordland in Norway.

Service history

World War II, 1943–1946

Kilchrenan spent her war years homeported in Gibraltar performing convoy and patrol duties along the western African coast. Returned to U.S. Navy custody in December 1946, she was struck from the Naval Vessel Register in 1947.

In commercial service, 1947–present
She was purchased by Norwegian Hardanger Sunnhordlandske Dampskipsselskap (HSD) in 1947, rebuilt as a passenger ship and given the name M/S Sunnhordland. She ran for several years in western Norway.

The ship was sold to Finland in 1974 as M/S Kristina Brahe and until 2010 operated as a passenger ship by Kristina Cruises of Kotka, Finland, making short cruises in the Baltic Sea and Lake Saimaa. The Kristina Brahe was sold to Saimaan Matkaverkko Ltd in August 2010. Her name was shortened to simply Brahe. In 2015 she was sold again, and brought back to western Norway where she operates as a cruise ship. Her name was changed back to M/S Sundhordland.

See also
List of cruise ships
List of patrol vessels of the United States Navy

References

External links

Patrol vessels of the United States Navy
Ships of Finland
Ships transferred from the United States Navy to the Royal Navy
1943 ships
World War II naval ships of the United Kingdom